The Lakeview Homestead Complex is a heritage-listed homestead complex at Bergalia in the Eurobodalla Shire local government area of New South Wales, Australia. It was added to the New South Wales State Heritage Register on 2 April 1999.

Heritage listing 
The Lakeview Homestead Complex was listed on the New South Wales State Heritage Register on 2 April 1999.

See also 

Australian residential architectural styles

References

Attribution 

New South Wales State Heritage Register
Eurobodalla Shire
Homesteads in New South Wales
Articles incorporating text from the New South Wales State Heritage Register